Karen McCloskey (born June 16, 1951) is an American rower. She competed in the women's quadruple sculls event at the 1976 Summer Olympics.

References

External links
 

1951 births
Living people
American female rowers
Olympic rowers of the United States
Rowers at the 1976 Summer Olympics
Sportspeople from Long Branch, New Jersey
Sportspeople from Monmouth County, New Jersey
21st-century American women